László Kelemen (born in Szőny, Hungary, 4 March 1958) is a Hungarian attorney and writer.

Professional career 
László Kelemen was awarded a degree in law from the Faculty of Law of the Eötvös Loránd University, Budapest in 1982. In 1985 he passed the Legal Qualifying Examination with distinction, and then started to practice as an attorney-at-law, as a member of the Budapest Bar Association. He established and currently heads the Kelemen, Mészáros, Sándor & Partners Law Practice in Budapest.

In addition to his degree in Law, he also holds a degree in Psychology, awarded in 2008 from the Faculty of Arts, University of Szeged.

Besides his work at the legal practice, he has been a postgraduate student at the Graduate School of Psychology at the University of Pécs between 2010 and 2014. He received his PhD degree in 2014 in this institution.

Publications 
 Joghallgatók a jogról (2009)
 Miként vélekedünk a jogról? (2010)
 Social Psychological Researches in Hungary in 2010-2011 (2012)
 Kelemen László, Hollán Miklós: Joghallgatók a jogról II. (2013)

External links 
 http://www.kelemenlaszlo.hu/
 http://kelemen-lawfirm.hu/
 Publications are available: http://www.kelemenkiado.hu/

20th-century Hungarian lawyers
Living people
1958 births
21st-century Hungarian lawyers